Pecatonica Township is located in Winnebago County, Illinois. As of the 2010 census, its population was 4,355 and it contained 1,750 housing units.

Geography

Demographics

Points of Interest
Pecatonica Township contains the Pecatonica Wetlands Forest Preserve, a county park.

References

External links
City-data.com
Winnebago County Official Site

1849 establishments in Illinois
Populated places established in 1849
Rockford metropolitan area, Illinois
Townships in Illinois
Townships in Winnebago County, Illinois